Wendy E. Diamond is an American philanthropist, social entrepreneur, impact investor, animal welfare advocate, best-selling author, and television personality. She is the founder and CEO of LDP Ventures, an investment company focused on socially responsible ventures. Diamond is also the founder of Women's Entrepreneurship Day Organization, a global movement to economically empower women to alleviate poverty. In addition, Diamond is the creator of Animal Fair Media Inc., the world’s premiere pet lifestyle media platform, bridging celebrity/pop culture with animal rescue/welfare when she learned 12 million animals were euthanized a year.

Early life and education 
Wendy E. Diamond was born in Chagrin Falls, Ohio and in 1992, graduated from Pine Manor College in Chestnut Hill, Massachusetts with an associate's degree.

Awards and honors 

 GC4W Honored Wendy Diamond as a Global Champion For Women at the Library of Congress in Washington DC on International Women's Day in 2015.
 In 2016, Ellis Island Honors Society awarded Diamond the Ellis Island Medal of Honor in recognition of her humanitarian efforts.
 In 2019, Diamond received the Women's Entrepreneurship Day Pioneer Award at the United Nations in recognition of her lifetime achievements. This is officially recognized by both Houses of the United States Congress and placed in the Congressional Record.
 In 2020, the WBAF Board appointed Diamond as a Senator to represent United States of America in the Grand Assembly of the World Business Angels Investment Forum (An affiliated partner of the G20 Global Partnership for Financial Inclusion (GPFI).

Career

Author
While volunteering at the Coalition for the Homeless, she met Peter Jennings and launched two cookbooks which raised about two hundred thousand dollars for homeless charities. The first, A Musical Feast, features the recipes of musical artists such as Madonna and Steven Tyler. The second was called An All-Star Feast, which features the favorite meals of various athletes, including Michael Jordan and Derek Jeter.

Diamond's volunteering with the Coalition for the Homeless inspired her to turn her focus towards homeless animals. She adopted her Russian Blue cat Pasha from The Animal Care and Control facility in New York City. She later adopted her Maltese, Lucky. Soon after that, she conceived, created and founded Animal Fair, the first ever pet lifestyle media company. Diamond has partnered with animal rights organizations in order to use her book launches and charity fundraising events.

Animal Fair magazine 
Diamond founded Animal Fair Magazine, which has played a significant role in the pet world as a pioneer in promoting animal adoption. Animal Fair Magazine, under Diamond's leadership, has been at the forefront of featuring celebrities and their pets, establishing a trend of showcasing adopted pets in the media. Animal Fair Magazine was the first publication to feature well-known figures and their adopted pets, helping to bring attention to the importance of animal adoption and the rewards of providing a loving home for shelter animals. By highlighting the bond between celebrities and their rescue pets, Animal Fair Magazine has helped to destigmatize adoption and promote the idea that rescue animals can make wonderful companions. The magazine's efforts to increase awareness about the benefits of adoption have inspired countless readers to adopt pets of their own. As a result, Diamond and Animal Fair Magazine's contributions have made a lasting impact in the world of animal welfare.

Animal Fair Magazine’s premiere issue featured Renee Zellweger and her dog, Dylan, on its cover. The magazine is dedicated to highlighting non-profit animal organizations, providing pet parenting and health tips, and showcasing celebrities and their pets. It has featured a host of A-list celebrities including Beyoncé Knowles, Halle Berry, Regis Philbin, Charlize Theron, Pamela Anderson, Ashley Tisdale, Shania Twain, Jessica Alba, Jessica Biel, Serena Williams, Kim Cattrall, Matt Leinart, Hilary Duff, Eric McCormack, Kristen Bell, Bo Derek, Diane Lane, Alicia Silverstone, Hayden Panettiere and LeAnn Rimes. 

Animal Fair Magazine is known for its advocacy for animal welfare, and its coverage has brought attention to various non-profit organizations dedicated to animal rescue and protection. It has also been instrumental in educating pet parents about responsible pet parenting and providing them with valuable tips for the health and well-being of their pets.

Overall, Animal Fair Magazine has had a positive impact on animal welfare and has helped to raise awareness of important issues related to pet care and responsible pet ownership. It has been influential in shaping public opinion and has helped to inspire people to take action to improve the lives of animals.

Television career 
Diamond has appeared on television series including Single in the City on the WE: Women's Entertainment network, Lucky Travels on Animal Planet and Relationship Rehab on the Style Network. She frequently contributes to Today, Fox News Channel, CNN, Good Morning America and has appeared in countless other media outlets worldwide, including The View, The Oprah Winfrey Show, Extra (TV series), Forbes, The New York Times, People, Vogue, MTV, VH1, and E!. She has been dubbed by The New Yorker as the "Martha Stewart of the Milk and Bone dish", New York Post called her the "Pet Diva", and Forbes dubbed her the "Canine Queen". In Summer 2008, Diamond was featured as one of the judges of the summer CBS prime-time series Greatest American Dog alongside Victoria Stilwell and American Kennel Club board member, Allan Reznick. Diamond served as a judge alongside Whoopi Goldberg and Betty White for the American Humane Association's Hero Dog Awards on The Hallmark Channel.

Other venues 
Diamond's production company Lucky Diamond Productions are Executive Producers and Creator of the pilot for NBC Mutt Makeover, Executive Producer and Host of Paws for Style Special on Fox. Lucky Diamond Production's latest project is In Search Of Puppy Love, a docucomedy that premiered at the Boston Film Festival and also played at the Cancun International Film Festival. The film is based on Wendy's Yappy Hour Rescue Tour that raised over $200,000 for animal rescue and features celebrity appearances and interviews with Warren Beatty, Hugh Hefner, Jeremy Piven, Paula Abdul, Kathy Griffin, Hilary and Haylie Duff, Betty White, Fred Willard, Delta Burke, Moby, Aaron Pike, and many others.

Diamond was appointed to the World Entrepreneurs Day Advisory Board in March 2010 as Chief Pet Officer  She later spoke at the World Entrepreneur's Day kickoff on April 14 at the UN. She later founded the Women's Entrepreneurship Day, held annually on November 19, with the first day held in 2014.

Diamond and her dog, Lucky, served as the celebrity Grand Marshals for the 2010 Krewe of Barkus Mardi Gras parade on February 7, 2010 in New Orleans, Louisiana. Diamond also co-chaired and hosted the unveiling of the Katrina Pet Memorial for animals affected by Hurricane Katrina

On June 12, 2010 Diamond spoke at the H+ Summit (an event considering issues within transhumanism) hosted by the student organization Harvard College Future Society in conjunction with Humanity+. Her talk examined her projections for the future of pets and the pet industry. That year she also held the Yappy Hour Rescue Tour, which visited 15 different US cities to raise money for local animal rescue groups.

In November 2011, Lucky Diamond earned the Guinness World Record for most photographed dog with celebrities. At that date, Lucky had taken a total of 363 photos with celebrities. In 2012, Diamond's pet Baby Hope Diamond as a part of the Guinness World Record for most expensive pet wedding. The total cost was $270,000, all entirely donated from donors raising awareness for the Humane Society of New York. The donated amount was about $250,000 higher than the previous record holder. An additional $50,000 was raised for the society on top of the in-kind donations to the ceremony. Triumph, the Insult Comic Dog served as the ceremony's officiant, and the other dog used in the ceremony was the winner of an online vote.

In 2013 Diamond led the Bark Business Tour, which partnered with groups like K9s for Warriors. The tour was initiated to bring awareness to the issue of US Army veteran suicides, visiting ten different cities and raising $220,000. The money raised went to raising service dogs and pairing them with soldiers suffering from PTSD. In 2015 Diamond sued an online stalker that had been sending false and defamatory emails with the intention of ruining her reputation since 2010, including false claims about the allocation of funds raised in her fundraisers.

Selected bibliography

 
 
 
 
  (Foreword by Wendy Diamond)
  (Foreword by Wendy Diamond)

References

External links

Living people
American magazine editors
Pine Manor College alumni
People from Chagrin Falls, Ohio
Participants in American reality television series
American cookbook writers
Women cookbook writers
People from Manhattan
Writers from Cleveland
Jewish women writers
Journalists from New York City
Journalists from Ohio
American women non-fiction writers
Women magazine editors
Year of birth missing (living people)
21st-century American women
People associated with cryptocurrency
People associated with Bitcoin